Hugh Jones (1889 – 10 November 1918) was an English cricketer. He played for Gloucestershire in 1914.

References

1889 births
1918 deaths
English cricketers
Gloucestershire cricketers
British Army personnel of World War I
British military personnel killed in World War I
Gloucestershire Regiment officers
Recipients of the Military Cross
Deaths from the Spanish flu pandemic in England
Military personnel from Gloucestershire